Gary B. North, is an American writer and activist. He is a newspaper editor, former president of the Los Angeles Newspaper Guild/Southern California Media Guild (AFL-CIO), and a founder of BiNet USA as well as the Conflict Resolution Service and CredibilityWatch.org. In 1988, he published the first national bisexual newsletter, called Bisexuality: News, Views, and Networking. He was formerly the president of the bisexual civil rights organization BiNet USA and is now its treasurer.

References

External links
 Personal website
 Los Angeles Newspaper Guild/Southern California Media Guild
 BiNet USA
 Conflict Resolution Service
 CredibilityWatch.org

Year of birth missing (living people)
Living people
Bisexual men
Bisexual rights activists
American LGBT rights activists
American bisexual writers